Dejan Živković (Serbian Cyrillic: Дејан Живковић; born 28 April 1982) is a Serbian professional footballer who plays as a midfielder.

Honours
Radnik Surdulica
 Serbian First League: 2014–15

External links
 
 

Association football midfielders
First League of Serbia and Montenegro players
FK Borac Čačak players
FK Radnik Surdulica players
FK Smederevo players
Serbian First League players
Serbian footballers
Serbian SuperLiga players
Sportspeople from Smederevo
1982 births
Living people